Valverde de Júcar is a municipality located in the province of Cuenca, Castile-La Mancha, Spain. According to the 2016 census (INE), the municipality has a population of 1,173 inhabitants.

References

Municipalities in the Province of Cuenca